Pleurosaurus (from  , 'rib' or 'side' and  , 'lizard') is an extinct genus of diapsid reptiles belonging to the group Sphenodontia, extinct relatives of the modern tuatara. Pleurosaurus fossils were discovered in the Solnhofen Limestone of Bavaria, Germany and Canjuers, France. It contains two species, P. goldfussi and P. ginsburgi.

Pleurosaurus is one of the few known aquatic sphenodontians. The body was heavily modified from those of other rhynchocephalians, including an elongated triangular skull. It swam via the use of poorly efficient axial undulatory anguilliform locomotion (the movement of the body side to side) in shallow marine environments, and was probably piscivorous. It had only small limbs, which probably did not aid in swimming, and nostrils placed far back on the head, close to the eyes.

History of discovery 
Pleurosaurus was first described from the Solnhofen Limestone by Christian Erich Hermann von Meyer in 1834, based on the species Pleurosaurus goldfussi. In 1970 fossils were reported from the lithographic limestones in a quarry near the village of Aiguines in the Canjuers plateau, France. In 1974, Pleurosaurus ginsburgi was described based on MNHN 1983-4-CNJ 67, a mostly complete skeleton found at the Aiguines quarry.

Description 
Pleurosaurus goldfussi and Pleurosaurus ginsburgi are distinguished by differing skull proportions, different numbers of presacral vertebrae, and considerably shorter forelimbs on P. ginsburgi.

References

Jurassic lepidosaurs
Sphenodontia
Solnhofen fauna
Prehistoric reptile genera